Nani's Gang Leader (also known simply as Gang Leader) is a 2019 Indian Telugu-language action comedy film written and directed by Vikram Kumar. Produced by Mythri Movie Makers, the film stars Nani, Kartikeya, Priyanka Arul Mohan, Lakshmi, Saranya Ponvannan, Shriya Reddy and Praanya P. Rao. The music is composed by Anirudh Ravichander. In this film, five  women seek the help of a crime novelist to avenge the death of their loved ones. The film was released on 13 September 2019, after being pushed back from previously scheduled release date of 30 August 2019. It received positive response from critics.

Plot
Six individuals successfully completed a bank robbery worth  after which one robber kills the rest of the five and escapes with the money. Five bereaved women - Saraswati, who lost her grandson; Varalakshmi, who lost her son; Priya, who lost her fiancé Avinash; Swati, who lost her elder brother; and Srinidhi (Chinnu), who became mute due to the shock of losing her father. They are brought together by Saraswati to avenge their loved ones. Pencil Parthasarathy, a small time crime novelist who watches American movies and rewrites their plots into local Telugu novels, is approached by the five women in hope of tracking down the culprit. Pencil initially refuses, but sensing a good and probably first original story agrees to help them. The ragtag group, who eventually name themselves as Revengers, narrow down on a main suspect: Dev. 

Dev is an ambulance driver turned F1 racer, who is now the new sensation in India. In order to buy a sports bike, Dev killed his father and gained insurance. He also took up his father's job as an ambulance driver. One day, in the hospital, he joined a group of five cancer patients planning a robbery to save money for their loved ones before they die. Afterwards, he kills the five and steal the money and followed his passion of becoming a successful race driver. The Revengers plot against him to bring him to justice. They discretely follow him and finds the stashed money in the constructed building (where the five and Dev had practiced for the robbery). Dev learns that there is a gang behind him and also stole the money, He deduce Pencil's identity and also tips off the cops about the robbery and also Pencil's details in it. 

Pencil successfully transfers the money before the police raid his place. However to his shock, he deduced that the money was stolen by Saraswati, who reveals that her husband, who was working at a book store near the bank was killed by Dev on the night of the robbery. She convinced the gang into believing her grandson died to make her vengeance justified. She stole the money from Pencil's place and donated it for orphanage development and tells Pencil about her decision of abandoning the vengeance, after Chinnu's injury during one of the chases. Pencil kills Dev at the latter's garage to protect his newfound family, and frames it as a car accident. When he returns home, to his surprise, the gang decides to give up on the plan of killing Dev for their revenge. Priya decides to move on from her fiancé and when she learns that Pencil killed Dev, decides not to reveal it. Priya and Pencil get married where Pencil successfully publishes Gang Leader, encapsulating his experiences. Sukumar meets Pencil for the copyrights to make a movie based on his novel.

Cast 

Nani as "Pencil" Parthasarathy
Kartikeya as Dev
Priyanka Arul Mohan as Priya 
Lakshmi as Saraswathi
Saranya Ponvannan as Varalakshmi
Shriya Reddy as Swathi
Praanya P. Rao as Srinidhi "Chinnu"
Anish Kuruvilla as Sub Inspector
Vennela Kishore as Santoor Senakkayala
Priyadarshi Pulikonda as Ramakrishna
Satya as Subramanyam, Dev's former colleague
Vivek Kumar as RTO Officer
Sukumar as himself (cameo appearance)
Anirudh Ravichander as himself in the end credit song "Gang-u Leader"

Music 

The soundtrack of the film is composed by Anirudh Ravichander and lyrics by Anantha Sriram and Inno Genga. The promotional song of Gang Leader title track is reused in Dharala Prabhu.

Release
The film was released on 13 September 2019, after being pushed back from previously scheduled release date of 30 August 2019.

Reception

Critical reception 

The Times of India gave 3 out of 5 stars stating "Nani's Gang Leader tries to tick all the boxes but comes across as a half-hearted attempt, They succeed — but only in parts".

Behindwoods gave 3 out of 5 stars stating "Gang Leader is an inventive, wildly entertaining comedy with a great ensemble performance.".

The Indian Express gave 2.5 out of 5 stars stating "Gang Leader has its moments, thanks to Nani's effortless presence. He keeps the scenes lively and bright. It is not a bad film but that doesn't mean it is outstanding either".

References

External links
 

2010s Telugu-language films
2019 action comedy films
2019 films
Indian action comedy films
Indian films about revenge
Films about writers
Mythri Movie Makers films